Bogota is a borough in Bergen County, in the U.S. state of New Jersey. As of the 2020 United States census, the borough's population was 8,778, an increase of 591 (+7.2%) from the 2010 census count of 8,187, which in turn reflected a decline of 62 (−0.8%) from the 8,249 counted in the 2000 census.

Bogota was formed on November 14, 1894, from portions of Ridgefield Township, based on the results of a referendum held that day. The borough was formed during the "Boroughitis" phenomenon then sweeping through Bergen County, in which 26 boroughs were formed during 1894 alone. Portions of Bogota were taken in 1895 to form part of the newly created Township of Teaneck. Bogota was named in honor of the Bogert family, which had been the first European settlers to occupy the area, and may also be a blend of Bogert and Banta, another early family, with an "O" added to ease pronunciation.

The borough's name is pronounced  , unlike Bogotá, capital city of Colombia, which is accented on the final syllable.

Geography
Bogota is located on the east shore of the Hackensack River. According to the United States Census Bureau, the borough had a total area of 0.80 square miles (2.06 km2), including 0.76 square miles (1.95 km2) of land and 0.04 square miles (0.11 km2) of water (5.25%).

The borough borders Hackensack to the west, Ridgefield Park to the south and Teaneck on the north and east.

Bogota is bisected by the CSX River Line, which divides the borough into an eastern and western portion. The eastern half is highly industrial, with more busy roads. The western half is mainly suburban, with the exception of storefronts on West Main Street, River Road, and a development on West Fort Lee Road.

Demographics

2010 census

The Census Bureau's 2006–2010 American Community Survey showed that (in 2010 inflation-adjusted dollars) median household income was $77,375 (with a margin of error of +/− $13,132) and the median family income was $96,563 (+/− $12,361). Males had a median income of $53,460 (+/− $5,549) versus $46,350 (+/− $9,142) for females. The per capita income for the borough was $31,844 (+/− $2,819). About 8.2% of families and 7.9% of the population were below the poverty line, including 11.9% of those under age 18 and 3.4% of those age 65 or over.

2000 census
As of the 2000 United States census there were 8,249 people, 2,874 households, and 2,126 families residing in the borough. The population density was 10,841.3 people per square mile (4,190.7/km2). There were 2,915 housing units at an average density of 3,831.1 per square mile (1,480.9/km2). The racial makeup of the borough was 75.72% White, 5.73% African American, 0.15% Native American, 7.75% Asian, 0.06% Pacific Islander, 6.76% from other races, and 3.83% from two or more races. Hispanic or Latino of any race were 21.32% of the population.

There were 2,874 households, out of which 36.5% had children under the age of 18 living with them, 56.0% were married couples living together, 13.8% had a female householder with no husband present, and 26.0% were non-families. 21.9% of all households were made up of individuals, and 8.1% had someone living alone who was 65 years of age or older. The average household size was 2.85 and the average family size was 3.38.

In the borough the population was spread out, with 25.3% under the age of 18, 8.2% from 18 to 24, 32.1% from 25 to 44, 23.3% from 45 to 64, and 11.1% who were 65 years of age or older. The median age was 36 years. For every 100 females, there were 90.4 males. For every 100 females age 18 and over, there were 87.1 males.

The median income for a household in the borough was $59,813, and the median income for a family was $69,841. Males had a median income of $49,347 versus $36,406 for females. The per capita income for the borough was $25,505. About 2.6% of families and 4.0% of the population were below the poverty line, including 2.3% of those under age 18 and 4.2% of those age 65 or over.

Government

Local government
Bogota is governed under the Borough form of New Jersey municipal government, which is used in 218 municipalities (of the 564) statewide, making it the most common form of government in New Jersey. The governing body is comprised of a Mayor and a Borough Council, with all positions elected at-large on a partisan basis as part of the November general election. A Mayor is elected directly by the voters to a four-year term of office. The Borough Council is comprised of six members elected to serve three-year terms on a staggered basis, with two seats coming up for election each year in a three-year cycle. The borough form of government used by Bogota is a "weak mayor / strong council" government in which council members act as the legislative body, with the mayor presiding at meetings and voting only in the event of a tie. The mayor can veto ordinances subject to an override by a two-thirds majority vote of the council. The mayor makes committee and liaison assignments for council members, and most appointments are made by the mayor with the advice and consent of the council.

, the mayor of the Borough of Bogota is Republican Christopher M. "Chris" Kelemen, serving a term of office that expires on December 31, 2023. Members of the Bogota Borough Council are Council President Consuelo M. Carpenter (D, 2024), Jo-Ellen Granquist (D, 2023), Patrick H. McHale (D, 2025), John G. Mitchell (D, 2025), Mary Ellen Murphy (D, 2023) and Robert Robbins (D, 2024).

Kathryn Gates-Ferris was appointed in late 2015 to fill the seat vacated by Lisa Kohles.

The council seat expiring in 2015 held by Chris Kelemen was vacated when he took office as mayor in January 2015.

Citing the bitter political differences in the governing body and the loss of two council seats to Republican challengers in the general election that month, Mayor Patrick McHale resigned from office in November 2013 and was replaced on an acting basis by Council President Tito Jackson, who served in that role until the November 2014 election. In September 2011, the borough council appointed Wanda Uceta to fill the vacant seat of Joseph Nooto who had died earlier that month. In December 2013, Lisa Kohles was chosen to fill Jackson's vacant council seat for a term ending in December 2014.

In 2012, Democrats retained full control of borough government, as incumbent Jorge Nunez won re-election along with his running mate Robert Robbins, who won his first term in office.

In the November 2011 general election, Democrats gained control of all of the borough's elected positions. Patrick McHale was re-elected to a four-year term as mayor. Incumbents Michael Brophy and Tito Jackson were elected to new three-year terms, while Wanda Uceta won a two-year unexpired term and Evaristo Burdiez Jr. won his first full three-year term, after both Burdiez and Uceta had been appointed to fill vacancies.

In the 2010 General Election, Councilmen Joseph Noto and Michael Brophy won reelection, while first-time candidate Arthur Konigsberg also captured a seat. They defeated Councilwoman Anne Marie Mitchell and challengers Jared Geist and Guillermo Martinez. Brophy led the way with 1,235 votes, followed by Noto with 1,072 and Konigsberg with 1,060. Mitchell received 966 votes, while Geist and Martinez earned 847 and 775 votes, respectively. Noto and Konigsberg won three-year terms, while Brophy—who was appointed to fill a vacancy last year—will serve for an additional year to finish the uncompleted term.

In July 2006, then-Mayor Lonegan created a controversy when he engineered a borough council resolution requesting the removal of a Spanish-language billboard in the borough that was advertising McDonald's iced coffee. Lonegan said the billboard was "divisive." The story received national publicity, occurring concurrently with a national debate on illegal immigration. The 2003 mayoral election won by Lonegan was the subject of the documentary Anytown, USA.

Federal, state and county representation
Bogota is located in the 5th Congressional District and is part of New Jersey's 37th state legislative district.

Politics
As of March 2011, there were a total of 4,345 registered voters in Bogota, of which 1,549 (35.7% vs. 31.7% countywide) were registered as Democrats, 735 (16.9% vs. 21.1%) were registered as Republicans and 2,060 (47.4% vs. 47.1%) were registered as Unaffiliated. There was one voter registered to another party. Among the borough's 2010 Census population, 53.1% (vs. 57.1% in Bergen County) were registered to vote, including 69.6% of those ages 18 and over (vs. 73.7% countywide).

On the national level, Bogota leans strongly toward the Democratic Party. In the 2016 presidential election, Democrat Hillary Clinton received 2,454 votes (63.9% vs. 54.2% countywide), ahead of Republican Donald Trump with 1,230 votes (32.1% vs. 41.1% countywide) and other candidates with 154 votes (4.0% vs. 3.0% countywide), among the 3,890 ballots cast by the borough's 5,244 registered voters for a turnout of 74.2% (vs. 73% in Bergen County). In the 2012 presidential election, Democrat Barack Obama received 2,308 votes (66.7% vs. 54.8% countywide), ahead of Republican Mitt Romney with 1,085 votes (31.4% vs. 43.5%) and other candidates with 30 votes (0.9% vs. 0.9%), among the 3,458 ballots cast by the borough's 4,796 registered voters, for a turnout of 72.1% (vs. 70.4% in Bergen County). In the 2008 presidential election, Democrat Barack Obama received 2,291 votes (63.3% vs. 53.9% countywide), ahead of Republican John McCain with 1,270 votes (35.1% vs. 44.5%) and other candidates with 26 votes (0.7% vs. 0.8%), among the 3,619 ballots cast by the borough's 4,759 registered voters, for a turnout of 76.0% (vs. 76.8% in Bergen County). In the 2004 presidential election, Democrat John Kerry received 2,009 votes (57.2% vs. 51.7% countywide), ahead of Republican George W. Bush with 1,458 votes (41.5% vs. 47.2%) and other candidates with 16 votes (0.5% vs. 0.7%), among the 3,511 ballots cast by the borough's 4,646 registered voters, for a turnout of 75.6% (vs. 76.9% in the whole county).

In the 2017 gubernatorial election, Democrat Phil Murphy received 62.4% of the vote (1,289 cast), ahead of Republican Kim Guadagno with 35.2% (728 votes), and other candidates with 2.4% (49 votes), among the 2,147 ballots cast by the borough's 5,053 registered voters (81 ballots were spoiled), for a turnout of 42.5%. In the 2013 gubernatorial election, Republican Chris Christie received 55.2% of the vote (1,178 cast), ahead of Democrat Barbara Buono with 42.8% (913 votes), and other candidates with 2.0% (42 votes), among the 2,243 ballots cast by the borough's 4,694 registered voters (110 ballots were spoiled), for a turnout of 47.8%. In the 2009 gubernatorial election, Democrat Jon Corzine received 1,151 ballots cast (53.1% vs. 48.0% countywide), ahead of Republican Chris Christie with 856 votes (39.5% vs. 45.8%), Independent Chris Daggett with 119 votes (5.5% vs. 4.7%) and other candidates with 9 votes (0.4% vs. 0.5%), among the 2,168 ballots cast by the borough's 4,549 registered voters, yielding a 47.7% turnout (vs. 50.0% in the county).

Education
Students in pre-kindergarten through twelfth grade are educated in the Bogota Public Schools. As of the 2018–19 school year, the district, comprised of three schools, had an enrollment of 1,135 students and 97.6 classroom teachers (on an FTE basis), for a student–teacher ratio of 11.6:1. Schools in the district (with 2018–19 enrollment data from the National Center for Education Statistics.) are 
E. Roy Bixby School with 286 students in grades K–6, 
Lillian M. Steen School which served 293 students in grades K–6 and 
Bogota High School with an enrollment of 520 students in grades 7 through 12. Lillian M. Steen School was one of nine schools in New Jersey honored in 2020 by the National Blue Ribbon Schools Program, which recognizes high student achievement.

Public school students from the borough, and all of Bergen County, are eligible to attend the secondary education programs offered by the Bergen County Technical Schools, which include the Bergen County Academies in Hackensack, and the Bergen Tech campus in Teterboro or Paramus. The district offers programs on a shared-time or full-time basis, with admission based on a selective application process and tuition covered by the student's home school district.

Saint Joseph Academy is a Catholic school serving students in pre-kindergarten through eighth grade, operating under the auspices of the Roman Catholic Archdiocese of Newark.

Transportation

Roads and highways
Bergen County CR 56-1, whose terminus is within the borough, CR 56-2, and CR 41 all pass through Bogota.

Interstate 80 passes through the southern tip of the borough, continuing from Ridgefield Park in the west onto its terminus in Teaneck to the east, and is accessible at Exit 67 in Ridgefield Park, just south of Bogota. Route 4 is accessible in Teaneck. These highways provide access to the George Washington Bridge, the New Jersey Turnpike, the Garden State Parkway and other portions of the area's transportation network. There are several bridges, including the Court Street Bridge and the Midtown Bridge that span the Hackensack River to Hackensack.

Public transportation

Several NJ Transit bus lines travel through Bogota between Hackensack, Jersey City, Paramus and New York City. NJ Transit bus service is available to and from the Port Authority Bus Terminal in Midtown Manhattan on the 155 and 168 routes; to the George Washington Bridge Bus Station on the 182 route; and to other New Jersey communities served on the 83 (to Jersey City), 751 and 755 routes.

Passenger rail service to Bogota station ended in 1966, but the right of way for freight lines of New York, Susquehanna and Western Railroad (NYSW) and the CSX River Subdivision (formerly the West Shore Railroad) run along the riverbank on the west side of town. The Passaic–Bergen–Hudson Transit Project is a NJ Transit proposal to restore passenger service along the rail corridor with potential stations at West Fort Lee Road and Central Avenue.

Popular culture
The 2005 documentary film Anytown, USA focused on the 2003 mayoral race between Republican Steve Lonegan, Democrat Fred Pesce and independent Dave Musikant. The film was screened at the Minneapolis-St. Paul International Film Festival on April 9, 2005, where it won the award for Best Documentary.

Notable people

People who were born in, residents of, or otherwise closely associated with Bogota include:

 Eddie Adams (1933–2004), photographer and photojournalist who won a Pulitzer Prize in 1969 for his photo of police chief General Nguyễn Ngọc Loan executing a Vietcong prisoner, Nguyễn Văn Lém, on a Saigon street
 Jimmy Gnecco (born 1973), musician from the Ours
 Beth Hall (born 1958), actress best known for her portrayal of Wendy Harris on the CBS sitcom Mom
 Richie Incognito (born 1983), guard for the Buffalo Bills of the National Football League
 Steve Lonegan (born 1956), politician who served for 12 years as Mayor of Bogota, was candidate for Governor of New Jersey in 2005 and 2009, and was the 2013 U.S. Senate candidate in the election following the death of Frank Lautenberg
 Norman Pittenger (1905–1997), Anglican theologian who was one of the first acknowledged Christian defenders for the open acceptance of homosexual relations among Christians
 Stanley Foster Reed (1917–2007), entrepreneur
 Sid Schacht (1918–1991), pitcher who appeared in 19 games in the Major Leagues for the St. Louis Browns (1950–1951) and Boston Braves (1951)
 Pat Schuber (born 1947), politician who served for four years as Mayor of Bogota, represented the district in the New Jersey General Assembly from 1982 to 1990 and served 12 years as the County Executive of Bergen County.
 Vin Scully (born 1927), sportscaster for the Los Angeles Dodgers
 Pat Sullivan (born 1971), assistant coach for the New York Knicks
 Al Yates (1945–2007), outfielder who played in Major League Baseball for the Milwaukee Brewers

Sources
 Municipal Incorporations of the State of New Jersey (according to Counties) prepared by the Division of Local Government, Department of the Treasury (New Jersey); December 1, 1958.
 Clayton, W. Woodford; and Nelson, Nelson. History of Bergen and Passaic Counties, New Jersey, with Biographical Sketches of Many of its Pioneers and Prominent Men. Philadelphia: Everts and Peck, 1882.
 Harvey, Cornelius Burnham (ed.), Genealogical History of Hudson and Bergen Counties, New Jersey. New York: New Jersey Genealogical Publishing Co., 1900.
 Van Valen, James M. History of Bergen County, New Jersey. New York: New Jersey Publishing and Engraving Co., 1900.
 Westervelt, Frances A. (Frances Augusta), 1858–1942, History of Bergen County, New Jersey, 1630–1923, Lewis Historical Publishing Company, 1923.

References

External links

 Bogota official website
 Bogota News

 
1894 establishments in New Jersey
Borough form of New Jersey government
Boroughs in Bergen County, New Jersey
Populated places established in 1894
New Jersey populated places on the Hackensack River